Giovanni Battista Acquaviva (1513-1569) was a Roman Catholic prelate who served as Bishop of Nardò (1536–1569).

Biography
Giovanni Battista Acquaviva was the son of Italian nobleman Belisario Acquaviva, and younger brother of Giacomo Antonio Acquaviva. He was piously educated, and while still young took the ecclesiastical path.

On 22 May 1536, he was appointed by Pope Paul III as administrator of the Diocese of Nardò,
 with the right to become bishop at age twenty-seven. He worked diligently, assisted by his vicars-general. In 1563 he called a diocesan synod, which he solemnly celebrated in the presence of the chapter and the clergy of the city and diocese. Various necessary decrees and norms were promulgated at the time. In 1568 Bishop Acquaviva brought the Carmelite monks to settled in the city.

He served as Bishop of Nardò until his death at the age of fifty-six on August 13, 1569.

See also 
Catholic Church in Italy

References

External links and additional sources
 (for Chronology of Bishops) 
(for Chronology of Bishops) 

16th-century Italian Roman Catholic bishops
1569 deaths
Bishops appointed by Pope Paul III
1513 births